"How Cool Is That" is a song co-written and recorded by American country music artist Andy Griggs.  It was released in May 2001 as the first single from the album Freedom.   The song reached #22 on the Billboard Hot Country Singles & Tracks chart.  The song was written by Griggs, Wendell Mobley and Neil Thrasher.

Chart performance

References

2001 singles
2001 songs
Andy Griggs songs
Songs written by Andy Griggs
Songs written by Wendell Mobley
Songs written by Neil Thrasher
Song recordings produced by David Malloy
RCA Records singles